Nadine Hoskinson (died 30 May 2010), well known as Elizabeth Oldfield was a popular British writer of over 40 romance novels in Mills & Boon from 1982 to 1998, when she retired from romance. In her sixties, she decided to return to writing, and was published again in 2007.

Biography
Nadine Hoskinson married and had one daughter and one son. Her daughter later had 2 grandchildren. When in the 1980s her husband's job took them to live in Singapore. She had articles published in magazines and newspapers in the United Kingdom and Singapore. Later, she decided to write a book, but first she would practice on a small book. The only small books that she had were Mills & Boon romances. Her first book was accepted in 1982 as Elizabeth Oldfield, and she had enjoyed writing it during 18 years and 40 novels. She retired from romance in 1998 to travel with her husband. She died on 30 May 2010.

Bibliography

Single novels

Postcards from Europe series (multi-author)
Sudden Fire (1993)

Omnibus in Collaboration
Bodyguards (1997) (with Sandra Field)

References and Resources
Harlequin Enterprises Ltd's website
Elizabeth Oldfield's webpage in Fantastic Fiction's website

British romantic fiction writers
Year of birth missing
2010 deaths